Cyclone Numa, also known as Medicane Numa, was a Mediterranean tropical-like cyclone with the properties of a subtropical cyclone. Numa formed on 11 November 2017 west of the British Isles, out of the extratropical remnants of Tropical Storm Rina, the seventeenth named storm of the 2017 Atlantic hurricane season. Subsequently, on 17 November, Numa acquired subtropical characteristics before reaching peak intensity on 18 November, becoming a rare "medicane". After making landfall in Greece on 18 November, Numa rapidly weakened, and was later absorbed into another extratropical storm on 20 November. The flooding triggered by Numa became the worst weather event Greece had experienced since 1977, and the storm caused an estimated $100 million (2017 USD) in damages in Europe.

The National Observatory of Athens named the system Zenon.

Meteorological history
On 12 November, the Free University of Berlin named a low-pressure system over the British Isles Numa. Moving southeastward, Numa quickly crossed the southern British Isles, and then France and Italy, before splitting into two low-pressure centres – Numa I and Numa II – on 13 November. By 14 November, low-pressure centre Numa I had dissipated, and Numa II dominated the system, and the system was referred to simply as "Numa," while it was located in the open Mediterranean, to the west of Greece.

Numa subsequently slowed and turned south, crossing southern Italy and emerging to the north of Sicily, before stalling over the island on 15 November. Clearing Sicily to the southeast on 16 November, Numa began to gain subtropical characteristics, while situated off the west coast of Greece, though by 16 November, the system was still extratropical. Around this time, some computer models forecasted that Numa may soon transition into a warm-core subtropical or tropical cyclone, which would bring stronger winds and more flash flooding to Greece if this were to occur.

On 17 November, Numa stalled in the Ionian Sea and completely lost its frontal system. On the afternoon of the same day, Météo France tweeted that Numa had attained the status of a subtropical Mediterranean depression. According to ESTOFEX, Numa showed numerous  flags of 10-minute sustained winds in satellite data. During the next several hours, Numa continued to strengthen, before reaching its peak intensity on 18 November. Around the time of Numa's peak, the storm had a clear, well-defined eye structure, with the National Oceanic and Atmospheric Administration noting an eyewall similar to that of a hurricane's. Later on the same day, Numa made landfall in Greece, producing a storm surge at the Gulf of Patras and damaging wind gusts, before rapidly weakening into a low-pressure area afterward. Subsequently, the system emerged into the Aegean Sea on 19 November. On 20 November, Numa was absorbed into another extratropical storm approaching from the north.

Impact
Prior to Numa's arrival, unusually heavy rainfall from other storm systems had been affecting mainland Greece for around a week, leading to some localised flooding. The fire brigade had received over 600 calls relating to flooding in the days preceding Numa's arrival, dispatching more than 200 firefighters in 55 vehicles to villages across the country to assist.

Numa was linked to exceptionally heavy rainfall across the Balkans in mid-November, which lasted for over week, killing at least 21 people in Greece, with Athens being the worst affected area. However, the National Observatory of Athens did not link the flooding to Numa, naming an earlier low which had initiated the flooding Eurydice.

The flooding associated with Numa became the deadliest weather event that Greece has experienced since 1977.

Numa began to bring heavy rainfall to already saturated areas of the Balkans beginning on 15 November, causing severe flooding, especially in central mainland Greece. By 16 November, at least 16 people had been killed by flooding in the towns of Mandra, Megara, and Nea Peramos to the west of Athens, with five people missing. Many of those who were killed were elderly residents unable to escape their homes, as floodwaters quickly rose. On 19 November, the death toll in Greece increased to 19, while 3 people still remained missing. On 21 November, the death toll increased to 21, with 1 man still missing.

At least 86 people were rescued and at least 37 people were hospitalised across Greece, and more than one third of buildings were destroyed in the town of Nea Peramos, including over 1,000 homes. Thousands of homes were left without electricity or running water after being inundated by more than a metre of floodwater, with the national electricity grid suffering severe damage. More than 20 schools remained closed on 17 November, with further flooding anticipated, while Numa stalled off the Greek coast.

In the aftermath of the flooding, Greek Prime Minister Alexis Tsipras declared three days of national mourning and a state of emergency, saying it was "the least we can do". Food, water and blankets were distributed to victims in the worst affected towns. The deputy governor of the worst-affected West Attica region, Yiannis Vassileiou, likened the flooding to Niagara Falls, while mayor of Mandra Yianna Krikouki referred to the flooding as "biblical", with the flooding leaving "nothing standing" in the town. European Commission President Jean-Claude Juncker, French President Emmanuel Macron, and Turkish Deputy Prime Minister Hakan Çavuşoğlu expressed their condolences to the people of Greece, following the tragedy. A 364-cabin cruise ship was later opened up as a shelter for those made homeless by the disaster.

See also

Tropical cyclones in 2017
Mediterranean tropical-like cyclone
Tropical Storm Rolf (2011)
Cyclone Qendresa (2014)
Cyclone Ianos (2020)

References

Further reading

External links

European Emergency Response Coordination Centre map
Medicane Numa / Zenon headed for landfall along the western coast of Greece - Severe Weather Europe
NUMA IN LANDFALL SULLA GRECIA - Meteocalabria.net (In Italian)
European Medicanes Monitoring Center website
Mediterranean Tropical Products Page - Satellite Services Division - Office of Satellite Data Processing and Distribution
Northeast Atlantic and Mediterranean Imagery - NOAA

Numa
2017 in Greece
2017 meteorology
2017 natural disasters
Weather events in Greece
November 2017 events in Europe
Subtropical cyclones
Genoa lows
Numa
2017 disasters in Europe